Jaylaani Nur Ikar, also known as Jeylani Nur Ikar, is a Somali politician. He was the First Deputy Speaker of the Federal Parliament of Somalia.

Career

Federal Parliament
On 20 August 2012, Ikar was among the legislators nominated to the newly established Federal Parliament of Somalia.

First Deputy Speaker of the Federal Parliament
On 29 August 2012, Ikar was appointed First Deputy Speaker of the Federal Parliament opposite Second Deputy Speaker Mahad Abdalle Awad. They were serving under Speaker Mohamed Osman Jawari.

But after the election of the new president mohammed abdullaahi farmaajo he did not get elected as the deputy speaker of the Federal Parliament.

References

External links
Federal Parliament - Jailani Nor Ikar Sheikh Sufi

Living people
Members of the Federal Parliament of Somalia
Year of birth missing (living people)